Oncidium auriferum is a species of orchid ranging from western South America to northern Venezuela.

auriferum